This is a list of communes of Luxembourg by population density. Cities are given in italics.

See also

List of communes of Luxembourg by area
List of communes of Luxembourg by highest point
List of communes of Luxembourg by lowest point
List of communes of Luxembourg by population

References

Population density
Luxembourg, communes